In Wales, the office of Mayor or Lord Mayor (respectively in Welsh Maer and Arglwydd Faer)  had long been ceremonial posts, with little or no duties attached to it.  Traditionally mayors have been elected by town, borough and city councils.  Since 2000, councils can decide to have directly elected mayors with extensive powers if such a proposal is approved in a local referendum.

List of mayoralties in Wales

Lord Mayors

The right to appoint a Lord Mayor is less frequently bestowed than city status.

Currently, only two cities in Wales have Lord Mayors: Cardiff and Swansea.

Mayors
See also borough status in England and Wales for a list of Welsh areas having a borough charter (and therefore a mayor). County boroughs are highlighted here in bold text. Many towns have lost their borough status (for example as a consequence of the Local Government Act 1972) but continued the tradition of appointing or electing mayors to the ongoing Town Councils.

 Aberaeron
 Ammanford
 Bangor (City Council) 
 Barry
 Beaumaris
 Blaenau Gwent
 Bridgend County Borough  
 Builth Wells
 Caernarfon
 Cardigan
 Carmarthen
 Colwyn 
 Conwy
 Cowbridge
 Crickhowell
 Cwmamman
 Dolgellau
 Glynneath
 Haverfordwest
 Hay-on-Wye
 Holyhead
 Kidwelly
 Knighton
 Llandrindod Wells
 Llandudno
 Llanelli
 Llangollen
 Llanrwst
 Llanwrtyd Wells
 Machynlleth
 Merthyr Tydfil
 Monmouth
 Narberth
 Neath
 Neath Port Talbot
 Newport (City Council)
 Newtown
 Pembroke
 Pembroke Dock
 Pontardawe  
 Porthcawl
 Port Talbot
 Presteigne
 Rhayader
 Rhondda Cynon Taff 
 Saundersfoot (Community Council) 
 St Asaph (City Council) 
 St Davids (City Council) 
 Talgarth
 Tenby
 Torfaen
 Vale of Glamorgan
 Welshpool
 Wrexham

Mayoresses and Lady Mayoresses

The wife of a male Mayor is called the Mayoress and accompanies him to civic functions. A male or female Mayor may appoint a female consort, usually a fellow councillor, as Mayoress.  In May 2000 the mayor of Cwmamman, Howard Power, appointed his 15-year-old niece Marianne Coleman as mayoress, because his wife was too busy to fill the role. In 2008 the new Mayor of Narberth, Suzanne Radford-Smith, nominated her aunt to be Mayoress.

The consort of a Lord Mayor is the Lady Mayoress.

See also
Directly elected mayors in England and Wales
Local government in Wales
List of mayors of Cardiff
Lord Mayors of Swansea
Mayor of Newport
Mayor of Wrexham
Mayor of Carmarthen

References

Local government in Wales
 Mayors
Ceremonial officers in Wales